Neuroblastoma highly expressed 1 is a protein that in humans is encoded by the NHEG1 gene.

References

Further reading